Birger Jarls torg is a public square on Riddarholmen in Gamla stan, the old town in Stockholm, Sweden.

History
The square used to be called Riddarholmstorget, but was in the mid-19th century renamed Birger Jarls torg after Birger Jarl, traditionally attributed as the founder of Stockholm. A statue of him was erected on the square in 1854. It was designed by Swedish sculptor
Bengt Erland Fogelberg (1786–1854).  

The square is surrounded by six palaces, today mostly occupied by various governmental authorities. The area is isolated from the rest of the city by the artery traffic route Centralbron. (See Riddarholmen.)
Just south of the square is the church Riddarholm Church.

See also
List of streets and squares in Gamla stan

References

Squares in Stockholm